The 2019 Women's Gold Cup (known as the 2019 Hero Women's Gold Cup for sponsorship reasons) was a 4-team association football tournament held at the Kalinga Stadium in the Indian city of Bhubaneswar between 9 and 15 February 2019. The tournament was being organized by the All India Football Federation in association with Government of Odisha, as part of the senior women's team's preparation for AFC 2020 Olympic Qualification - Second Round.

Participating nations 
The FIFA Rankings, as of 7 December 2018:
 (44)
 (60)
 (62)
 (108)

Venue

Round Robin
All matches are held in Bhubaneswar.
Times listed are UTC+05:30.

Final

See also

 Women's football in India
 Women's football

References

External links
 

Sports competitions in Odisha
Bhubaneswar
International association football competitions hosted by India
Women's Gold Cup (India)
Women's Gold Cup (India)
Women's Gold Cup (India)
2019 in Indian women's sport